Russian MP can refer to 
 A member of the Russia Military Police
 A member of the State Duma, the lower house of the Russian Federal Assembly